Chester Anton Mathias Hansen (born May 1, 1992) is a Canadian musician and songwriter, best known as bassist of instrumental group BADBADNOTGOOD. As a Grammy Award-winning songwriter, Hansen often works with his bandmates and producer Frank Dukes and is credited for co-writing hit songs by Drake, Kendrick Lamar, Daniel Caesar, and Kali Uchis, among others.

Personal life and career 
Hansen was born on May 1, 1992, in Ottawa, Ontario. He was raised in the Nepean area of the city and attended Canterbury High School, a local arts magnet school. Growing up, he played piano and shifted his focus to the bass during high school. Beginning in his teens, Hansen worked on and released music which combined hip-hop, jazz, and electronic influences.

In 2010, Hansen began attending Humber College in Toronto to study music performance. In his first year, he met fellow music students Alexander Sowinski and Matthew Tavares and began collaborating with them, creating what would become BADBADNOTGOOD. The band had viral success in 2011 after posting jazz covers of Odd Future songs online, and released their debut record that Fall. He withdrew from school in February 2012.

With BBNG, Hansen has released five full-length albums, including a collaborative record with Ghostface Killah, and has been short-listed for the Polaris Music Prize twice.

In the early 2010s, Hansen began working with close BBNG collaborator Frank Dukes. With him, as well as other members of BBNG, they composed original music for hip-hop music sampling. Of note, fellow Canadian Drake used a song Hansen had written with Dukes, "Vibez," in his 2014 single "0 to 100 / The Catch Up" and another track was used in Rihanna's 2016 song "Sex with Me." As part of BBNG, Hansen also works as a songwriter and producer, which includes writing music for sampling as well as working with fellow artists in the studio.

Artistry 
Hansen's style and sound is often compared to that of the 1960s and 1970s, particularly because of his stocky, warm bass tone. One critic commented, "Hansen has married the sounds and dexterous, melodic playing style of yesteryear with a modern band and music scene."

As a bassist, Hansen often plays a Gibson Grabber and a vintage Gibson SB-300. He employs a variety of basses in live settings including a Gallien-Krueger 800/700 RB (with an 8×10 GK cab), a Gallien-Krueger Fusion 500 (with a 4×10 Kicker CX cab), and a D’Angelico Excel SD. He has commented that he likes to use thick flat-wound strings far off of the neck.

Additionally, Hansen often plays keyboards on records. He has perfect pitch.

Discography 
With BADBADNOTGOOD

 BBNG (2011)
 BBNG2 (2012)
 III (2014)
 Sour Soul (with Ghostface Killah) (2015)
 IV (2016)
 Talk Memory (2021)

Production and songwriting credits 
Partial discography, adapted from SOCAN. Note, Hansen's work is sometimes incorrectly credited to C. John "Jack" Hansen, a producer notable for his work with Buddy Holly.

Production credits as part of BADBADNOTGOOD 

Notable credits include,
 Kendrick Lamar: "Lust." from Damn. (2016) (Certifications – US: gold)
 GoldLink: "Fall in Love" (featuring Cisero) (2016)
 Daniel Caesar: "Get You" (2016) (Certifications: US: 2× platinum; CAN: 2× Platinum; UK: silver)
 Kali Uchis: "After the Storm" (featuring Tyler, the Creator and Bootsy Collins) from Isolation (2018) (Certifications – US: gold)
 Khalid and Swae Lee: "The Ways" from Black Panther (2018)

Other credits 
 The Living Sound System – Night of the Living Sound System (2011); keys
Talib Kweli –  "What's Real" (featuring RES) from Gravitas (2013) (uncredited) – with Frank Dukes
Drake – "0 to 100 / The Catch Up " (2014) (samples "Vibez") (Certifications US: 2× platinum; UK: Silver) – with Frank Dukes
Talib Kweli – "Arsenio Hall Show" (2014) – with Frank Dukes
 Yuna – "Broke Her" (2014) (samples "Vibez") – with Frank Dukes
Fabolous – "Bish Bounce" from The Young OG Project (2014) – with Frank Dukes
Wale – "The Helium Balloon" from The Album About Nothing (2015) – with Frank Dukes
 Logic – "Top Ten" feat. Big K.R.I.T. (2015) (samples "Vibez") – with Frank Dukes
 Mac Miller – "Perfect Circle / God Speed" from GO:OD AM (2015) (uncredited) – with Frank Dukes
Kingsway Music Library – Colors (2015); bass, keys, vocals – with Frank Dukes
 Estan –The Vanity Of Reason (2015); bass
 Rihanna – "Sex with Me" from ANTi (2016) (Certifications – US: 2× platinum; UK: Silver) – with Frank Dukes
 TGOD Mafia – "Stay the Same" from Rude Awakening (2016) (samples "Vibez") – with Frank Dukes
 Lil Pump – "Flex Like Ouu" from Lil Pump (2017) (Certifications – US: gold) – with Frank Dukes
 Aminé – "Yellow" from Good for You (2017) – with Frank Dukes
Saukrates – "The Grand Design" from Season 2 (2017) – with Frank Dukes
 Charlotte Day Wilson – "Doubt" (2017); writing, bass, guitar
 Charlotte Day Wilson – "Let You Down" and "Funeral" from Stone Woman EP (2018); bass
 Matty – Déjàvu (2018); bass, writing
Wes Allen – Funny Thing EP (2018); producer, mixed, instrumentation
 Jerry Paper – Like A Baby (2018); bass 
Tropics – "Never Letting Go" and "Come Home" off Nocturnal Souls (2018); bass
 Matty – "Selfportrait" (2019); writing, bass
 Elijah Blake – "Half in Love" (2019); writing
 Safe – "No Rush" from Stay (2019); writing
Doug Shorts – "Heads or Tails" from Casual Encounter (2019) – with Frank Dukes
Antony Carle – "Cut in Line" from The Bitch of Living (2020); writing
Ben L'Oncle Soul – "Next To You" feat. Yuna and "I Love This Game" from Addicted to You (2020); bass
Beachtown Exile – Feeling Again (2020); mixing
Steve Arrington – "Good Mood" from Down To The Lowest Terms: The Soul Sessions (2020); bass (prod. Jerry Paper)
Rogê - "Pra Vida" (2022); bass

Awards 
As part of BADBADNOTGOOD

As producer and songwriter

References

External links
Official BBNG website

Canadian jazz bass guitarists
1992 births
Living people